Huamanga is a province in the northern part of the Ayacucho Region in Peru. The capital of the province is the city of Ayacucho.

Political division
 Ayacucho (Ayacucho)
 Acocro (Acocro)
 Acos Vinchos (Acos Vinchos)
 Carmen Alto (Carmen Alto)
 Chiara (Chiara)
 Jesús Nazareno (Las Nazarenas)
 Ocros (Ocros)
 Pacaycasa (Pacaycasa)
 Quinua (Quinua)
 San José de Ticllas (Ticllas)
 San Juan Bautista (San Juan Bautista)
 Santiago de Pischa (San Pedro de Cachi)
 Socos (Socos)
 Tambillo (Tambillo)
 Vinchos (Vinchos)
 Andrés Avelino Cáceres Dorregaray (Jardín)

Geography 
Other mountains are listed below:

Ethnic groups 
The people in the province are mainly indigenous citizens of Quechua descent. Quechua is the language which the majority of the population (50.37%) learnt to speak in childhood, 49.31% of the residents started speaking using the Spanish language and  0.11 	% using Aymara (2007 Peru Census).

See also 
 Battle of Ayacucho
 Hatun Usnu
 Kachimayu
 Marayniyuq
 Pampas de Ayacucho Historical Sanctuary
 Qunchupata
 Wichqana

Sources

External links
  Official Web Site of Municipalidad Provicial de Huamanga
  Ayacucho República Aristocrática photo gallery

Provinces of the Ayacucho Region